Noël Hallé (2 September 1711, Paris – 5 June 1781, Paris) was a French painter, draftsman and printmaker. He was born into a family of artists, the son of Claude-Guy Hallé.

Hallé took the Prix de Rome in 1736. He studied at the French Academy in Rome from 1737 until 1744 under the direction of Jean-Francois de Troy. As a history painter, he received royal commissions for work at the Grand Trianon, Choisy, the Petit Trianon, and for the Batiments; he worked for the Gobelins Manufactory factory, for the city of Paris and for the King of Poland.  Among his works are Ancient Rome-related The Death of Seneca, Cornelia, Mother of the Gracchi and The Justice of Trajan. Hallé has had numerous works displayed at the Louvre including La Dispute de Minerve et de Neptune and La fuite en Egypte.

References

External links
Profile at Safran-Arts.com
Artist Biography at The Matthiesen Gallery
Louvre Database

1711 births
1781 deaths
Painters from Paris
French draughtsmen
French printmakers
18th-century French painters
French male painters
Prix de Rome for painting
18th-century French male artists